Liu Meng (born 20 October 1996) is a Chinese para table tennis player. She won a gold medal at the 2016 Summer Paralympics.

Liu's lower left leg was amputated when she was six years old, following a car accident.

References

1996 births
Living people
Table tennis players at the 2016 Summer Paralympics
Table tennis players at the 2012 Summer Paralympics
Paralympic medalists in table tennis
Medalists at the 2016 Summer Paralympics
Chinese female table tennis players
Paralympic gold medalists for China
Paralympic table tennis players of China
Table tennis players from Wuhan
Chinese amputees
21st-century Chinese women